Nadia Petrova was the defending champion, but withdrew with a left hip injury before the tournament began.

Petra Kvitová won the title, defeating Angelique Kerber in the final, 6–2, 0–6, 6–3.

Seeds
The top eight seeds receive a bye into the second round.

 Victoria Azarenka (second round)
 Agnieszka Radwańska (quarterfinals)
 Sara Errani (second round)
 Caroline Wozniacki (semifinals)
 Angelique Kerber (final)
 Jelena Janković (third round)
 Petra Kvitová (champion)
 Roberta Vinci (second round)
 Sloane Stephens (second round)
 Carla Suárez Navarro (first round)
 Ana Ivanovic (third round)
 Samantha Stosur (third round)
 Simona Halep (third round)
 Kirsten Flipkens (second round)
 Sorana Cîrstea (third round)
 Dominika Cibulková (third round)

Draw

Finals

Top half

Section 1

Section 2

Bottom half

Section 3

Section 4

Qualifying

Seeds

Qualifiers

Qualifying draw

First qualifier

Second qualifier

Third qualifier

Fourth qualifier

Fifth qualifier

Sixth qualifier

Seventh qualifier

Eighth qualifier

References
 Main Draw
 Qualifying Draw

2013 Singles
2013 WTA Tour
Singles